Anolis anchicayae is a species of lizard in the family Dactyloidae. The species is found in Colombia and Ecuador.

References

Anoles
Reptiles of Colombia
Reptiles of Ecuador
Reptiles described in 2009
Taxa named by Steven Poe
Taxa named by Ernest Edward Williams